Lime Mountain may refer to:

 Lime Mountain (Maricopa County, Arizona), United States
 Lime Mountain (Elko County, Nevada), United States
 Lime Mountain (Beaver County, Utah), United States
 Lime Mountain (Juab County, Utah), United States

See also
 Lime Peak (Arizona)